The Taiwan Accreditation Foundation (TAF) is an organization based in Tamsui District, Taipei, Taiwan which provides third party accreditation services in compliance with international standards.

History
The organization was established by the Ministry of Economic Affairs on 17 September 2003 by merging Chinese National Laboratory Accreditation and Chinese National Accreditation Board.

Organizational structures
 Department of Administration
 Department of Certification Body Accreditation
 Laboratory Accreditation Department I
 Laboratory Accreditation Department II

Branch office
 Hsinchu City

See also
National Standards of the Republic of China

References

External links
 

2003 establishments in Taiwan
Organizations based in Taipei
Scientific organizations established in 2003